Richard Sharpe, Hon.  (17 February 1954 – 22 March 2020) was a British historian and academic, who was Professor of Diplomatic at the University of Oxford and a fellow of Wadham College, Oxford. His broad interests were the history of medieval England, Ireland, Scotland and Wales. He had a special concern with first-hand work on the primary sources of medieval history, including the practices of palaeography, diplomatic and the editorial process, as well as the historical and legal contexts of medieval documents. He was the general editor of the Corpus of British Medieval Library Catalogues, and editor of a forthcoming edition of the charters of King Henry I of England.

Biography

Starpe studied at St Peter's School, York and then took his BA at Trinity College, Cambridge, studying Classics for Part I of the degree and then Anglo Saxon, Norse and Celtic for Part II, where he studied with, amongst others, Simon Keynes, Kathleen Hughes and Michael Lapidge. He graduated with a first in 1977, and published his first book, a history of Raasay the same year. Sharpe stayed in the ASNaC department for his PhD, on Latin-language Irish hagiography, which was the basis for his 1991 Medieval Irish Saints' Lives: an introduction to 'Vitae sanctorum Hiberniae'. From 1981 to 1990, Sharpe was an assistant editor of the Dictionary of Medieval Latin from British Sources.

As the University of Oxford's 2018–2019 Lyell Reader in Bibliography, Sharpe delivered that year's Lyell Lectures on the topic of "Libraries and Books in Medieval England: The Role of Libraries in a Changing Book Economy". He was elected a Fellow of the British Academy (FBA) in 2003, and an Honorary Member of the Royal Irish Academy in 2018. In 2020, he was elected a Corresponding Fellow of the Medieval Academy of America.

Publications

Books as author

References

Fellows of Wadham College, Oxford
British medievalists
English palaeographers
1954 births
Fellows of the British Academy
Fellows of the Society of Antiquaries of London
Fellows of the Royal Historical Society
Members of the Royal Irish Academy
2020 deaths
Surtees Society